The 2011–12 Missouri Tigers men's basketball team represented the University of Missouri in the 2011–12 NCAA Division I men's basketball season. Their head coach was Frank Haith, who was in his 1st year at Missouri. Haith won AP Coach of the Year honors for this season. The team played its home games at Mizzou Arena in Columbia, Missouri and they were members of the Big 12 Conference. It was the final year in which the Tigers participated in the Big 12 Conference, as they departed for the Southeastern Conference beginning with the 2012–13 season.

Roster 

Notes:
 Jabari Brown transferred from Oregon in the 2012 spring semester. He will be eligible to play in the 2013 spring semester.

Schedule

|-
!colspan=12 style=|Preseason 

|-
!colspan=12 style=|Non-conference regular season

|-
!colspan=12 style=|Big 12 Regular Season

|-
!colspan=12 style=|Big 12 Tournament 

|-
!colspan=12 style=|NCAA Tournament

Average Home Attendance

Rankings

*AP does not release post-NCAA Tournament rankings

References 

Missouri
Missouri Tigers men's basketball seasons
Missouri
Tiger
Tiger